Paul Rae (born June 27, 1968) is an American film and television actor.

Biography
Rae was born Paul Rae Stuart in New Orleans, Louisiana, the son of Jean Rushing and the late Norman Stuart, and was raised in Bogalusa, Washington Parish, Louisiana. He graduated from Bogalusa High School in 1986.

Filmography

Film

Television

References

External links

1968 births
Living people
American male film actors
American male television actors
Male actors from New Orleans